The Diocese of Libmanan is a Roman Catholic diocese located in the municipality of Libmanan in the Ecclesiastical province of Caceres in the Philippines.

History
 December 9, 1989: Established as the Territorial Prelature of Libmanan from the Metropolitan Archdiocese of Caceres
 March 19, 1990: Canonical Erection of the Prelature of Libmanan
 March 19, 1990: Episcopal Ordination of Most Rev. Prospero N. Arellano, D.D.
 July 2, 2008: Canonical Possession and Installation of the second bishop-prelate, Most Rev. Jose R. Rojas Jr. D.D.
 March 25, 2009: Elevated to the rank of a diocese. 
 June 19, 2009: Canonical Erection of the Diocese of Libmanan.
 December 9, 2014: Silver Jubilee of the See of Libmanan.

Ordinaries

Seminaries
Saint Benedict Diocesan Seminary
Maharlika Highway, Del Pilar, San Fernando, Camarines Sur
St. James the Greater Minor Seminary
Station Church Site, Libmanan, Camarines Sur

References
 GCatholic.org
 Official Website of the Diocese of Libmanan

Christian organizations established in 1989
Roman Catholic dioceses and prelatures established in the 20th century
Roman Catholic dioceses in the Philippines
Roman Catholic Ecclesiastical Province of Cáceres
Religion in Camarines Sur